Saint-Florentin is the name of 2 communes in France:

 Saint-Florentin, Indre, in the Indre département
 Saint-Florentin, Yonne, in the Yonne département, chief town of the canton of Saint-Florentin
 Saint-florentin (cheese)  , soft cheese from canton of Saint-Florentin.